Miller Homestead may refer to:

 Miller Homestead (Pea Ridge, Arkansas), listed on the NRHP in Arkansas
J. K. Miller Homestead, Big Prairie, Montana, listed on the NRHP in Flathead County, Montana
 Miller Homestead (Au Sable, New York), listed on the NRHP in New York
 Miller Homestead (Lansing, North Carolina), listed on the NRHP in North Carolina

See also
 Miller House (disambiguation)